Ronald Paul "Ronny" Yeager (born August 16, 1952) is a retired American cross-country skier. He competed in the 15 km event at the 1972 and 1976 Winter Olympics and finished 52nd-56th; in 1976 he also placed sixth with the 4 × 10 km relay team.

Yeager studied at Durango High School and graduated from University of Colorado in 1972. After retiring from competitions he returned to his hometown and started Ronny Yeager Durango Outfitting company.

References

1952 births
Living people
American male cross-country skiers
Olympic cross-country skiers of the United States
Cross-country skiers at the 1972 Winter Olympics
Cross-country skiers at the 1976 Winter Olympics